Collegiate Academies operates six open-enrollment public charter high schools in Louisiana.

Schools
 Abramson Sci Academy 
 Collegiate Baton Rouge
 G. W. Carver High School
 Livingston Collegiate 
 Opportunities Academy
 Rosenwald Collegiate

History

August 2008: Sci Academy opens in New Orleans East.

April 2011: Interest in Sci Academy exceeds the number of seats available

August 2011: The 2011-2012 school year opens with a new special education program: Essential Skills. This course for scholars with cognitive disabilities attracts the attention of national educators including Doug Lemov, creator of Teach Like a Champion.

June 2012: Sci Academy graduates its first class of seniors. 97% of these students were accepted to a four-year college, and they matriculated to schools across the country, including Amherst College, Colorado College, Louisiana State University, and Wesleyan University.

August 2012: George Washington Carver Collegiate Academy and George Washington Carver Preparatory Academy open.

January 2014: Troy Simon, Sci Academy Class of 2012, introduces First Lady Michelle Obama at the White House College Opportunity Summit.

April 2014: Sci Academy was named the #2 high school in Louisiana by U.S. News & World Report.

Controversy

In 2013, three Collegiate Academies schools — Sci Academy, George Washington Carver Collegiate, and G.W. Carver Prep — had the highest suspension rates in New Orleans. At Carver Collegiate, 69 percent of its student body were suspended during the 2012-13 academic year; at Carver Prep and Sci Academy, the figures were 61 percent and 58 percent, respectively. The suspension rates led to the Southern Poverty Law Center sending an open letter to Collegiate Academies. Students were sent home for matters as trivial as "laughing too much ... hugging a friend, and most commonly for being 'disrespectful,'" according to The Times-Picayune. Allegations of the treatment of special-education students were particularly startling, including violations of the federal law that 10 suspensions of a special-education student should trigger an immediate meeting.

In 2014, a Better Education Support Team coalition joined more than 30 students and their relatives in filing a complaint against Collegiate Academies that its disciplinary policies were so severe that they bordered on child abuse and violated federal civil rights laws. The plaintiffs asked the U.S. Department of Justice and Education to investigate.

The incidents that led to the complaint led to three students withdrawing and protests. Students created a list of grievances that said, in part: 
We get disciplined for anything and everything. We get detentions or suspensions for not walking on the taped lines in the hallway, slouching, for not raising our hands in a straight line. [sic] The teachers and administrators tell us this is because they are preparing us for college. It trains us for the military, orworse [sic], for jail.
In addition, students complained that they lacked textbooks or even a library, and that the material being taught was below grade level.

In 2015, Collegiate Academies were among the New Orleans charter schools subject to a federal judge's landmark New Orleans special education settlement that tightened the state Education Department's oversight and required third-party monitoring.

Louisiana Department of Education issued a notice on Jan. 6, 2016, that George Washington Carver Collegiate had violated a special-education student's rights when the school suspended him for a full month.

References

Education in New Orleans
Charter schools in Louisiana